Bare is a village in Knić municipality, Šumadija district, Serbia.  In 2002, it had 390 inhabitants.

References

Populated places in Šumadija District